is a sumo video game developed and published by Namcot for the Super Famicom, which was released exclusively in Japan on December 18, 1992.

Famitsu gave it 26/40.

See also
 List of sumo video games

References

External links
 Super Oozumou: Netsusen Daiichiban at superfamicom.org 
 スーパー大相撲 熱戦大一番 / Super Oozumou: Netsusen Daiichiban at super-famicom.jp 

1992 video games
Namco games
Japan-exclusive video games
Super Nintendo Entertainment System games
Super Nintendo Entertainment System-only games
Sumo mass media
Fighting games
Video games developed in Japan
Video games set in Japan
Multiplayer and single-player video games